Quicksand: No Escape is a 1992 thriller television film directed by Michael Pressman starring Donald Sutherland, Tim Matheson, and Felicity Huffman. Kaley Cuoco appears in her debut role.

Plot
A hard-working architect is pulled into intrigue when his wife hires a private investigator to make sure he is just working late. The private eye sees an opportunity to frame him for a murder instead.

Cast
 Donald Sutherland as Murdoch
 Tim Matheson as Scott Reinhardt
 Felicity Huffman as Julianna Reinhardt
 Timothy Carhart as Charlie Groves
 Kaley Cuoco as Connie Reinhardt
 Jay Acovone as Det. Harris
 Amy Benedict as Ginger

External links 
 

1992 television films
1992 films
1990s English-language films
Films directed by Michael Pressman
1990s thriller films
American thriller television films
1990s American films